Inna Volodymyrivna Osypenko-Radomska (born 20 September 1982) is a Ukrainian-Azerbaijani sprint kayaker. Competing for Ukraine, she won four Olympic medals, including gold at the 2008 Olympics in K-1 500 m. She switched to Azerbaijan in 2014 and won a bronze medal at the 2016 Olympics.

Career
Osypenko-Radomska competed for Ukraine until 2014. She won a bronze medal in the K-4 1000 m at the 2001 ICF Canoe Sprint World Championships and silver in the same event at the 2003 World Championships. At the 2004 Summer Olympics, she took bronze in the K-4 500 metres.

Osypenko-Radomska was the K-1 500 m champion at the 2008 Summer Olympics. At the 2010 World Championships, she won gold in K-1 500 m and silver in K-1 200 m. She was awarded two bronze medals – in the K-1 200 m and K-1 500 m – at the 2011 World Championships. The following year, she won silver medals in the K-1 500 m and K-1 200 m at the 2012 Summer Olympics in London.

Osypenko-Radomska began competing for Azerbaijan in 2014. She won a bronze medal in K-1 200 m at the 2016 Summer Olympics in Rio de Janeiro.

On 29 August 2018, she was disqualified for four years after refusing an out-of-competition doping test in May 2018.

References

External links
 
 
 
 
 
 

1982 births
Canoeists at the 2000 Summer Olympics
Canoeists at the 2004 Summer Olympics
Canoeists at the 2008 Summer Olympics
Canoeists at the 2012 Summer Olympics
Canoeists at the 2016 Summer Olympics
Living people
Olympic canoeists of Ukraine
Olympic canoeists of Azerbaijan
Olympic gold medalists for Ukraine
Olympic bronze medalists for Ukraine
Olympic bronze medalists for Azerbaijan
Ukrainian female canoeists
Olympic medalists in canoeing
Olympic silver medalists for Ukraine
ICF Canoe Sprint World Championships medalists in kayak
Medalists at the 2012 Summer Olympics
Medalists at the 2008 Summer Olympics
Medalists at the 2004 Summer Olympics
Medalists at the 2016 Summer Olympics
Azerbaijani female canoeists
Ukrainian emigrants to Azerbaijan
Naturalized citizens of Azerbaijan
Doping cases in canoeing
Azerbaijani sportspeople in doping cases
Canoeists at the 2015 European Games
European Games competitors for Azerbaijan
Sportspeople from Kherson Oblast